Arroyo de San Serván is a municipality located in the province of Badajoz, Extremadura, Spain. According to the 2012 census (INE), the municipality has a population of 4267 inhabitants. The town's first census was held in 1842, as part of Badajoz.

References

Municipalities in the Province of Badajoz